The Commission on the Humanities and Social Sciences was convened by the American Academy of Arts and Sciences at the request of Senators Lamar Alexander (R-Tennessee) and Mark Warner (R-Virginia) and Representatives Tom Petri (R-Wisconsin) and David Price (D-North Carolina).

On June 19, 2013, the Commission issued its initial report The Heart of the Matter, along with a companion film created specially with the aid of Ken Burns and George Lucas.

The Commission was chaired by Richard H. Brodhead, President of Duke University, and John W. Rowe, retired Chairman and Chief Executive Officer of Exelon Corporation. Other Commission members included university, college, and community college presidents, museum directors, public servants, corporate executives, humanists, social scientists, and artists.

The Commission’s report has received wide press coverage and statements of support from at least fifteen national and state organizations.

References

External links 
 American Academy Commission on the Humanities and Social Sciences
 Humanities Indicators, a project of the American Academy
 American Academy of Arts and Sciences

Humanities organizations
Social sciences organizations